Howard Wayne (born November 2, 1948, in Fresno, CA) is the Vice Chair, Central Area of the San Diego County Democratic Party. Previously, he served as Democratic politician in the California State Assembly from 1996 until 2002, representing California's 78th State Assembly district.

Pre Assembly Career and Life
Wayne received his undergraduate degree from San Diego State University and his juris doctor degree from the University of San Diego School of Law. Prior to his service in the Assembly, Wayne was a Deputy Attorney General for 23 years from 1973 until 1996, focusing on consumer protection and child support cases. Prior to winning his Assembly bid in 1996, Wayne made two unsuccessful bids for the Assembly in 1990, losing the regular primary for the 78th district seat with 12.7% of the vote and losing a bid in a special primary election later that year after obtaining 15.5% of the vote.

Assembly Elections
Wayne was elected in 1996 after defeating former Assemblymember Tricia Hunter by a 49% to 45% margin. He was easily reelected by a 57% to 39% margin in 1998 after defeating Jean Roesch, a member of the Coronado Unified School District Board of Education. In 2000, Wayne won his last term over retired surgeon John Steel by a margin of 56% to 38%.

Post Assembly Career
In 2003, he briefly ran for San Diego City Attorney but dropped his bid before the election. He also returned to the Attorney General's office in 2003, serving as an Assistant Attorney General. Wayne originally planned to run for Donna Frye's city council seat had she been elected mayor of San Diego. However, Frye lost the election to Mayor Jerry Sanders. While she was serving out the remainder of her term, Wayne and his wife Mary remained busy, moving to South Africa in 2006 to help assist with that country's growing legal system. They returned to their Clairemont home in 2007. Frye was not able to run again for Council in 2010 due to term limits and Wayne actively campaigned for the District 6 council she vacated. Wayne lost the election to Republican challenger Lorie Zapf by a 5-point margin or 1570 votes.

References

Members of the California State Assembly
Living people
1948 births
21st-century American politicians